The Captain is a 2022 American sports documentary miniseries produced by ESPN Films. Directed by Randy Wilkins, the series focuses on the life and career of Derek Jeter, who served as captain of the New York Yankees of Major League Baseball. Debuting on ESPN and ESPN+ on July 18, the series has seven episodes, and ran until August 11. Spike Lee and Michael Tollin are executive producers on the series.

Development and release
Derek Jeter, who founded The Players' Tribune in 2014 as a means of allowing athletes to tell their stories, decided that he wanted to make a miniseries that would document his life and career with the New York Yankees of Major League Baseball (MLB). He got the idea when he decided to document receiving the phone call that informed him that he had been elected to the National Baseball Hall of Fame in 2020. Jeter wanted Spike Lee to direct the series. Lee became an executive producer on the series, but was too busy to direct. He contacted Randy Wilkins, a protégé, in June 2020 to ask him to direct the series. Wilkins interviewed Jeter for over 30 hours and interviewed more than 90 people in total. The Players' Tribune and Casey Close produced the series. Michael Tollin, Mandalay Sports Media, Excel Media, and Connor Schell also served as executive producers, making the series in association with MLB.

ESPN Films announced the series in May 2021. The series premiered at the Tribeca Festival in June 2022. The first two episodes of the series had a premiere night at Yankee Stadium on July 7. It premiered on ESPN and ESPN+ on July 18 following the Home Run Derby.

Synopsis
The majority of the series focuses on Jeter's tenure with the Yankees. The series documents Jeter's youth in the first episode, including a focus on his biracial identity and the racism he and his sister experienced as they grew up in Kalamazoo, Michigan, in the 1980s and 1990s. The series includes never-before-seen footage of Jeter's personal life, including his reaction to being selected by the Yankees in the 1992 MLB draft. It also covers Jeter's rift in his friendship with teammate Alex Rodriguez. The final episode serves as an epilogue, discussing Jeter's life after his retirement as a player, including his purchase of the Miami Marlins and decision to step down as chief executive officer.

The miniseries includes interviews with Jeter, his father Charles, mother Dorothy, sister Sharlee, and wife, Hannah Jeter. Also interviewed are Michael Jordan, Fat Joe, Desus Nice, The Kid Mero, Jadakiss, Eli Manning, and former Yankees players Rodriguez, Mariano Rivera, Jorge Posada, Tino Martinez, Paul O'Neill, CC Sabathia, Darryl Strawberry, Bernie Williams, Roger Clemens, and Andy Pettitte, as well as former manager Joe Torre, general manager Brian Cashman, and former coach Willie Randolph.

Episodes

Episode descriptions are provided by ESPN.

References

External links
 
 

2022 American television series debuts
2022 American television series endings
2020s American documentary television series
2020s American television miniseries
Baseball television series
New York Yankees